Jack Eichhorn (23 December 1926 – 20 February 2018) was an Australian rules footballer who played for the South Melbourne Football Club in the Victorian Football League (VFL).

Notes

External links 
		

1926 births
2018 deaths
Australian rules footballers from Victoria (Australia)
Sydney Swans players